Eugene Francis Kinkead (March 27, 1876 – September 6, 1960), was an American Democratic Party politician from New Jersey who represented the 9th congressional district from 1909 to 1913, and the 8th district from 1913 to 1915.

Biography
Kinkead was born while his parents were on a visit abroad, in Buttevant, County Cork, Ireland, United Kingdom on March 27, 1876. He attended parochial schools in Jersey City, New Jersey, and graduated from Seton Hall College in South Orange, New Jersey in 1895. He was president of the Jersey Railway Advertising Co. and the Orange Publishing Co. Kinkead was president of the board of aldermen of Jersey City in 1898.

Kinkead was elected as a Democrat to the Sixty-first, Sixty-second, and Sixty-third Congresses and served in office from March 4, 1909, until February 4, 1915, when he resigned.

After leaving Congress, he was sheriff of Hudson County, New Jersey from 1915 to 1917, and played a role in the Bayonne refinery strikes of 1915–1916. He was commissioned major of the military intelligence division of the American forces during World War I and stationed at the National War College in Washington, D.C. He was chairman of the executive committee of Colonial Trust Co. in New York City from 1929-1960. Kinkead died in South Orange, New Jersey, and was interred in Gate of Heaven Cemetery in East Hanover, New Jersey.

References

External links

Eugene Francis Kinkead at The Political Graveyard

 

1876 births
1960 deaths
Politicians from County Cork
Democratic Party members of the United States House of Representatives from New Jersey
American expatriates in the United Kingdom
Politicians from Jersey City, New Jersey
Burials at Gate of Heaven Cemetery (East Hanover, New Jersey)